Solmaz is a village in the Tavas District of Denizli Province in Turkey.

References

Villages in Tavas District